Nationality words link to articles with information on the nation's poetry or literature (for instance, Irish or France).

Events

 Clément Marot returns to Paris early this year. Also this year, he bests François de Sagon in a literary quarrel involving an exchange of satires and epigrams.

Works published
 Anonymous, Boccus and Sydrake, publication year uncertain but sometime from 1530 to this year, edited by John Twyne, an encyclopedia in dialogue form, derived from the Old French Sidrac, in which Boccus asks 847 questions and Sidrac answers them (see Sidrak and Bokkus).

Births

Death years link to the corresponding "[year] in poetry" article:
 Patrick Adamson (died 1592), Scottish divine, archbishop of St Andrews, diplomat and Latin-language poet
 Francisco de Aldana (died 1578), Spanish
 Thomas Preston (died 1598), a master of Trinity Hall, Cambridge, an English poet and perhaps a playwright

Deaths
Birth years link to the corresponding "[year] in poetry" article:
 Andrzej Krzycki (born 1482), archbishop, Latin prose writer and Polish-language poet often considered one of that nation's greatest humanist writers
 Thomas Murner died about this year (born 1475), German satirist, poet and translator
 Antonio Tebaldeo (born 1463), Italian poet who wrote in both Italian and Latin
 Gil Vicente (born c. 1465), prominent Portuguese playwright and poet who also wrote in Spanish

See also

 Poetry
 16th century in poetry
 16th century in literature
 French Renaissance literature
 Renaissance literature
 Spanish Renaissance literature

Notes

16th-century poetry
Poetry